Christopher Columbus is a bronze statue by sculptor Carlo Brioschi. The statue of Christopher Columbus was installed in Chicago's Grant Park, in the U.S. state of Illinois.  Created by the Milanese-born sculptor and installed in 1933, it was set on an exedra and pedestal designed with the help of architect Clarence H. Johnston. It was removed and put in storage in 2020.

In 1933, Chicago celebrated its 100th anniversary with the Century of Progress World's Fair.  In conjunction with the fair, Chicago's Italian-American community raised funds and donated the statue of the Genoese navigator and explorer Christopher Columbus.   It was placed at the south end of Grant Park, near the site of the fair, and located east of S. Columbus Drive and north of E. Roosevelt Road.

The bronze, beaux arts statue shows Columbus standing and gesturing into the distance with one hand.  In his other hand, he holds a scrolled map at his side.  On the sides of the statue's art deco pedestal are carved depictions of: one of Columbus' ships, the Santa Maria; astronomer and mathematician, Paolo Toscanelli, who plotted the course to the "New World;" the explorer, Amerigo Vespucci; and the seal of the City of Genoa.  In the four corners of the pedestal are busts allegorically representing, Faith, Courage, Freedom, and Strength.  Despite appearances, Brioschi's son has denied that the figure holding a fasces representing Strength was a portrait of Benito Mussolini.

The statue was vandalized on June 13, 2020 in the ongoing George Floyd protests.  After an incident on July 17, 2020, where a number of injuries occurred during a confrontation with police and an attempt to topple the controversial work, the statue was removed by July 24 order of Chicago's Mayor Lori Lightfoot.

See also
 List of monuments and memorials to Christopher Columbus
 List of public art in Chicago

References

1933 establishments in Illinois
1933 sculptures
Bronze sculptures in Illinois
Italian-American culture in Chicago
Outdoor sculptures in Chicago
Sculptures of men in Illinois
Statues in Chicago
Maps in art
Ships in art
Chicago
Vandalized works of art in Illinois
Statues removed in 2020